Nguyễn Siêu (924–967) was a warlord of Vietnam during the Period of the 12 Warlords. 

Siêu was a grandson of Nguyễn Hãng, a general from China. Siêu had two elder brothers, Nguyễn Khoan and Nguyễn Thủ Tiệp, both were warlords.

Siêu occupied Tây Phù Liệt (mordern Thanh Trì District, Hanoi), and titled himself Nguyễn Hữu Công (阮右公). Later, he was defeated by Đinh Bộ Lĩnh.

References

924 births
967 deaths
10th-century Vietnamese people
People from Vĩnh Phúc province
Vietnamese people of Chinese descent
Anarchy of the 12 Warlords